The Roman Catholic Archdiocese of Santiago de Chile is one of the five Latin Metropolitan sees of the Roman Catholic Church in Chile.

Ecclesiastical province 
Its Suffragan sees are:
 Roman Catholic Diocese of Linares
 Roman Catholic Diocese of Melipilla
 Roman Catholic Diocese of Rancagua
 Roman Catholic Diocese of San Bernardo
 Roman Catholic Diocese of San Felipe, Chile
 Roman Catholic Diocese of Talca
 Roman Catholic Diocese of Valparaíso

Special churches 
Its cathedral archiepiscopal see is the Metropolitan Cathedral of Santiago in the national capital Santiago de Chile.

It also has six Minor Basilicas: 

 Votive Temple of Maipú, a National Shrine in Maipú
 Basilica of Lourdes
 Basilica de la Merced 
 Basílica de Nuestra Señora del Perpetuo Socorro
 Basílica del Corazón de María, (Marian) 
 Basílica del Salvador, dedicated to the savior.

History 
 On 27 June 1561, Pope Pius IV established the Diocese of Santiago de Chile, on territories split off from the Diocese of La Plata o Charcas and the Archdiocese of Lima. 
 It lost territories repeatedly: on 22 May 1563 to establish the Diocese of Concepción, on 10 May 1570 to establish the Diocese of Córdoba and on 1806.03.28 to establish the Diocese of Salta. 
 Pope Gregory XVI elevated the bishopric to Metropolitan Archdiocese of Santiago de Chile on 21 May 1840. 
 Since then it has lost territory five more times: on 1840.07.01 to establish the then Diocese of La Serena (now an Archdiocese), on 1872.11.02: Lost territory to establish the then Mission sui juris of Valparaíso (now Diocese of Valparaíso, on 1925.10.18 to establish the Diocese of Rancagua, Diocese of San Felipe and Diocese of Talca, on 1987.07.13 to establish Diocese of San Bernardo (1987), and on 1991.04.04 to establish the Diocese of Melipilla (1991).
 Pope John Paul II visited the Archdiocese on 1 April 1987.

Statistics 
As per 2014, it pastorally served 4,205,000 Catholics (66.9% of 6,290,000 total) on 9,132 km² in 213 parishes and a mission with 877 priests (250 diocesan, 627 religious), 339 deacons, 3,109 lay religious (1,255 brothers, 1,854 sisters), 46 seminarians.

Ordinaries

Bishops of Santiago de Chile
 Rodrigo González de Marmolejo (1561–1564)
 Fernando de Barrionuevo (1566–1571)
 Diego de Medellín (1574–1593)
 Pedro de Azuaga (1596–1597)
 Juan Pérez de Espinosa (1600–1622)
 Francisco González de Salcedo Castro (1622–1634)
 Gaspar de Villarroel (1637–1651), appointed Bishop of Arequipa and later Archbishop of La Plata
 Diego de Zambrana de Villalobos y Cordero (1653), did not take effect
 Diego de Humansoro Carantía (1660–1676)
 Bernardo de Carrasco y Saavedra, O.P. (1678–1694), appointed Bishop of La Paz
 Francisco de la Puebla González (1694–1704)
 Luis Francisco Romero (1705–1717), appointed Bishop of Quito and later Archbishop of La Plata
 Alejo Fernando de Rojas y Acevedo (1718–1723), appointed Bishop of La Paz
 Alonso del Pozo y Silva (1723–1730), appointed Archbishop of La Plata
 José Manuel de Sarricolea y Olea (1730–1734), appointed Bishop of Cusco
 Juan Bravo del Rivero y Correa (1734–1743), appointed Bishop of Arequipa
 Juan González Melgarejo (1743–1753), appointed Bishop of Arequipa
 Manuel de Alday y Axpée (1753–1789)
 Blas Manuel Sobrino y Minayo (1788–1794), appointed Bishop of Trujillo
 Francisco José Marán (1794–1807)
 José Santiago Rodríguez Zorrilla (1815–1832)
 Manuel Vicuña Larraín (1832–1840)

Archbishops of Santiago de Chile

 Manuel Vicuña Larraín (1840–1843)
 Rafael Valentín Valdivieso y Zañartu (1847–1878)
 Mariano Casanova y Casanova (1886–1906)
 Juan Ignacio González Eyzaguirre (1908–1918)
 Crescente Errázuriz Valdivieso (1918–1931)
 José Horacio Campillo Infante (1931–1939)
 José María Cardinal Caro Rodríguez (1939–1958)
 Raúl Cardinal Silva Henríquez (1961–1983)
 Juan Cardinal Francisco Fresno (1983–1990)
 Carlos Cardinal Oviedo Cavada (1990–1998)
 Francisco Javier Cardinal Errázuriz Ossa (1998–2010)
 Ricardo Cardinal Ezzati Andrello (15 December 2010 – 23 March 2019)
 Celestino Cardinal Aós Braco (11 January 2020 – present)

Other affiliated bishops

Auxiliary bishops
Manuel Vicuña Larraín (1828–1832), appointed Bishop here
José Ignacio Cienfuegos Arteaga (1828–1832), appointed Bishop of Concepción 
José Miguel Arístegui Aróstegui (1869–1876)
Joaquín Larraín Gandarillas (1877–1897), became Archbishop (personal title) in 1893
Jorge Montes Solar (1892–1900)
José Ramón Astorga Salinas (1899–1906)
Rafael Fernández Concha  (1901–1912)
Miguel Claro Vásquez (1921), did not take effect (died on the day he was appointed)
Rafael Edwards Salas (1921–1938)
Antonio José Luis Castro Alvarez, SS.CC. (1926–1935)
Augusto Osvaldo Salinas Fuenzalida, SS.CC. (1941–1950), appointed Bishop of San Carlos de Ancud
Pio Alberto Fariña Fariña (1946–1971)
Emilio Tagle Covarrubias (1958–1961), becoming Apostolic Administrator and titular Archbishop in 1959; appointed Archbishop (personal title) of Valparaíso
Gabriel Larraín Valdivieso (1966–1968)
Fernando Ariztía Ruiz (1967–1976), appointed Bishop of Copiapó
Fernando (José Ismael) Errázuriz Gandarillas (1969–1973)
Sergio Valech Aldunate (1973–2003)
Enrique Alvear Urrutia (1974–1982)
Jorge Maria Hourton Poisson (1974–1992), appointed Auxiliary Bishop of Temuco
Manuel Camilo Vial Risopatrón (1980–1983), appointed Bishop of San Felipe
Patricio Infante Alfonso (1984–1990), appointed Archbishop of Antofagasta
Antonio Moreno Casamitjana (1986–1989), appointed Archbishop of Concepción (Santissima Concezione)
Cristián Caro Cordero (1991–2001), appointed Archbishop of Puerto Montt
Horacio del Carmen Valenzuela Abarca (1995–1996), appointed Bishop of Talca
Ricardo Cardinal Ezzati Andrello (2001–2006), appointed Archbishop of Concepción (Santissima Concezione) (later returned here as Archbishop); future Cardinal
Andrés Arteaga Manieu (2001–)
Cristián Contreras Villarroel (2003–2014), appointed Bishop of Melipilla
Fernando Natalio Chomalí Garib (2006–2011), appointed Archbishop of Concepción (Santissima Concezione)
Pedro Mario Ossandón Buljevic (2012–)
Galo Fernández Villaseca (2014–)
Luis Fernando Ramos Pérez (2014–2019), appointed Archbishop of Puerto Montt
Jorge Enrique Concha Cayuqueo (2015–2020), appointed Bishop of Osorno
Cristián Carlos Roncagliolo Pacheco (2017–)
Carlos Eugenio Irarrázaval Errázuriz (2019); did not take effect
Alberto Ricardo Lorenzelli Rossi (2019–)

Other priests of this diocese who became bishops
Pedro Felipe de Azúa e Iturgoyen, appointed Auxiliary Bishop of Concepción in 1735
José de Toro y Zambrano, appointed Bishop of Concepción in 1744
Pedro Miguel Argandoña Pastene Salazar, appointed Bishop of Córdoba (Tucumán), Argentina in 1745
Diego Antonio Elizondo y Prado, appointed Bishop of Concepción in 1840
José Agustín de la Sierra Mercado, appointed	Bishop of La Serena in 1842
Justo Donoso Vivanco, appointed Bishop of San Carlos de Ancud in 1848
Vicente Gabriel Tocornal Velasco, appointed	Bishop of San Carlos de Ancud, Chile in 1853; did not take effect
José Hipólito Salas y Toro, appointed Bishop of Concepción in 1854
José Manuel Orrego Pizarro, appointed Bishop of La Serena in 1868
Plácido Labarca Olivares, appointed Vicar Apostolic of Tarapacá in 1887; appointed Bishop of Concepción in 1890 (consecrated bishop in 1890)
Florencio Eduardo Fontecilla Sánchez, appointed Bishop of La Serena in 1890
Rafael Molina Cortez, appointed Titular Bishop of Sinopoli in 1884 (died in 1889 without being consecrated)
Ramón Ángel Jara Ruz, appointed Vicar General of Valparaíso in 1894; appointed Bishop of San Carlos de Ancud in 1898
Luis Enrique Izquierdo Vargas, appointed Bishop of Concepción in 1906
Eduardo Gimpert Paut, appointed Vicar General of Valparaíso in 1906 (titular bishop in 1916)
Luís Silva Lezaeta, appointed Vicar Apostolic of Antofagasta in 1904 (consecrated bishop in 1912)
Gilberto Fuenzalida Guzmán, appointed Bishop of Concepción in 1918
Carlos Silva Cotapos, appointed Bishop of La Serena in 1918
Prudencio Contardo Ibarra (priest here, 1883-1906), appointed Vicar General of Temuco (and titular bishop) in 1920
Martín Rucker Sotomayor, appointed Titular Bishop of Mariamme in 1923
Miguel León Prado, appointed Vicar General of Talca in 1913; appointed Bishop of Linares in 1925
Melquisedec del Canto Terán, appointed Bishop of San Felipe in 1925
Rafael Lira Infante, appointed Bishop of Rancagua in 1925
Carlos Labbé Márquez, appointed Vicar Apostolic of Tarapacá in 1926
Alfredo Cifuentes Gómez, appointed Bishop of Antofagasta in 1933
Ramón Munita Eyzaguirre, appointed Bishop of San Carlos de Ancud in 1934
Alfredo Silva Santiago, appointed Bishop of Temuco in 1935
Juan Subercaseaux Errázuriz, appointed Bishop of Linares in 1935
Jorge Antonio Larraín Cotapos, appointed Bishop of Chillán in 1937
Eduardo Larraín Córdovez, appointed Bishop of Rancagua in 1938
Manuel Larraín Errazuriz, appointed Coadjutor Bishop of Talca in 1938
Hernán Frías Hurtado, appointed Bishop of San Carlos de Ancud in 1940
Francisco Javier Valdivia Pinedo, appointed Bishop of Linares in 1940; did not take effect
Alejandro Menchaca Lira, appointed Bishop of Temuco in 1941
Roberto Moreira Martínez, appointed Bishop of Linares in 1941
Eladio Vicuña Aránguiz, appointedBishop of Chillán in 1955
Bernardino Piñera Carvallo, appointed Auxiliary Bishop of Talca in 1958
Alberto Rencoret Donoso, appointed Bishop of Puerto Montt in 1958
José Luis Castro Cabrera, appointed Bishop of San Felipe in 1963
Raul Silva Silva, appointed Auxiliary Bishop of Rancagua in 1963
Carlos González Cruchaga, appointed Bishop of Talca in 1967
Ignacio Ortuzar Rojas, appointed Auxiliary Bishop of Puerto Maldonado, Peru in 1968; did not take effect
Alberto Jara Franzoy, appointed Bishop of Chillán in 1982
José Joaquín Matte Varas, appointed Bishop of Chile, Military in 1983
Jorge Arturo Augustin Medina Estévez, appointed Auxiliary Bishop of Rancagua in 1984; future Cardinal
Pablo Lizama Riquelme, appointed Prelate of Illapel in 1985
Enrique Troncoso Troncoso, appointed Bishop of Iquique in 1989
Pedro Felipe Bacarreza Rodríguez, appointed Auxiliary Bishop of Concepción (Santissima Concezione) in 1991
Juan de la Cruz Barros Madrid, appointed Auxiliary Bishop of Valparaíso in 1995
Tomislav Koljatic Maroevic, appointed Auxiliary Bishop of Concepción (Santissima Concezione) in 1997
Ignacio Francisco Ducasse Medina, appointed Bishop of Valdivia in 2002
Guillermo Patricio Vera Soto (priest here, 1982-1991), appointed Prelate of Calama in 2003
Moisés Carlos Atisha Contreras, appointed Bishop of San Marcos de Arica in 2014

Sexual abuse lawsuit
On October 21, 2018, it was reported that Chile’s Court of Appeal ordered the office of Santiago’s Archbishop to pay 450 million pesos ($650,000) to three men who stated they were sexually abused for decades by Chilean priest Fernando Karadima. Court President Dobra Lusic denied on October 22 that a verdict had been reached and that the lawsuit was still ongoing. A complaint issued on October 25, 2018 accused former Archbishop Cardinal Francisco Javier Errázuriz Ossa of leading the cover-up of sex abuse committed by Karadima.  The complaint also named former Apostolic Nuncio to Chile Archbishop Giuseppe Pinto, Chilean Minister of the Court of Appeals Juan Manuel Muñoz, Archbishop of Santiago Cardinal Ricardo Ezzati Andrello, and the Auxiliary Bishop of Santiago Andrés Arteaga Manieu as witnesses to the cover-up On March 27, 2019, however the Court of Appeals ordered the Archdiocese to pay 100 million pesos (about US$147,000) for "moral damages" to each of the survivors: Juan Carlos Cruz, José Andrés Murillo and James Hamilton. The ruling was confirmed by their lawyer and Santiago Bishop Celestino Aos on March 28.

See also 
 List of Catholic dioceses in Chile

References

Sources and external links 
 Catholic-Hierarchy.org – Archdiocese of Santiago de Chile"

Roman Catholic dioceses in Chile
 
Roman Catholic ecclesiastical provinces in Chile
Catholic Church in Chile
Religious organizations established in the 1560s
Roman Catholic dioceses established in the 16th century